Arthur Woodall (4 June 1930 – 2005) was an English footballer who played in the Football League for Stoke City.

Career
Woodall was born in Stoke-on-Trent and played for amateur football Tunstall Park before joining Stoke City in 1953. He made his one and only appearance for the club in a 1–0 defeat at home to Oldham Athletic on 20 March 1954. He left the club at the end of the 1953–54 season and joined Cheshire League side Altrincham.

Career statistics

References

English footballers
Stoke City F.C. players
Altrincham F.C. players
English Football League players
1930 births
2005 deaths
Association football forwards